The Eagle Medallion, also marketed as the Renault Medallion, is a rebadged and mildly re-engineered North American version of the French Renault 21 marketed by American Motors Corporation under the Renault brand for the 1988 model year, and by Chrysler’s Jeep/Eagle division for the 1989 model year.

The front-engine, front-wheel drive, four-door D-segment, or mid-size Medallion was launched in North America on 1 March 1987. The Medallion was imported from France, sharing its platform with the Renault 21. Just eight days after the North American introduction of the Medallion, Renault initiated the sale of its stock in American Motors to Chrysler on 9 March 1987.

History
The Renault 21 was introduced in Europe in 1987 to compete in the large family-size market such as the VW Passat. Its clean design was the work of Giorgetto Giugiaro. Modified to meet safety and emissions requirements, as well as rebadged as the Medallion, it became a captive import for Renault's corporate partner, American Motors Corporation (AMC). It went on sale on 1 March 1987 as a 1988 model and filled the gap left after the slow-selling Renault 18i/Sportwagon and the venerable AMC Concord. Both the 18i sedan and Concord had been discontinued after the 1983 model year, while the Sportwagon version of the 18i was marketed through 1986. Therefore, from 1984 until 1987, AMC/Renault dealers offered no sedan larger than the small C-segment Alliance. The larger D-segment Medallion sedan was thus important to American Motors dealers and filled a hole in its product line when it was launched.

The Medallion was an Americanized version of the Renault 21, "a highly successful car in the European market." The Medallion was the second entry in a three-model marketing effort to expand market coverage for AMC/Jeep/Renault dealers beyond the four-wheel-drive Jeep utility vehicles. The first product in that plan was the C-segment Renault Alliance that launched for the 1983 model year, while the third was the E-segment Eagle Premier, which launched ten months after the D-segment Medallion. AMC/Renault was planning to sell between 40,000 to 45,000 Medallions annually.

Badged as the Renault Medallion at its press launch in the winter of 1986, it went on sale 1 March 1987 - a mere 8 days before Chrysler agreed to buy Renault's shares in American Motors - as an early 1988 model. The Medallion retained its Renault branding after the Chrysler buyout, through the end of the 1988 model year, despite Chrysler's creation of the Jeep/Eagle Division in the fall of 1987. Because the Medallion had been launched as a 1988 Renault model prior to Chrysler's buyout of AMC and creation of the Eagle marque - Chrysler's first new brand since 1955 - Chrysler waited until the beginning of the 1989 model year to rebrand the Medallion as an Eagle, so as not to confuse buyers by selling the Medallion under both Renault and Eagle nameplates for 1988.

The cars were marketed as "Eagle Medallion" for the 1989 model year and sold through the newly formed Jeep-Eagle division. As a distinct Chrysler subsidiary, the nearly 1,200 AMC-Jeep-Renault dealer organization would initially remain independent. As part of the buyout, Chrysler would continue AMC's program for U.S. distribution of the new Renault Medallion for five years, but not to sell a specific number of the French imports.

Design

The Medallion was built in Maubeuge using the platform of the European market Renault 21, and imported from France. It was re-engineered for the U.S. and Canadian markets and differed from the Renault 21 in numerous features, trims, frontal styling, stronger bumpers and safety features, as well as powertrain availability. The final assembly of options and trim was performed at a facility at the U.S. port of entry.

The front-wheel drive Medallion used the 2.2 L I4 engine that also powered the European Renault 25. It was mounted in a traditional longitudinal (front-back) configuration, driving the front wheels through either a 5-speed manual transmission or a 3-speed computer-controlled automatic. The longitudinal engine placement was somewhat unusual for a front-wheel drive car of this era, as the transverse engine layout is typically more space-efficient. However, Audi, SAAB, and Subaru used longitudinal engines with front-wheel-drive in this era, as well.

It was unusual that Renault designed the R21 to use transverse-mounted sub-2 liter engines, and longitudinal engines over 2 liters, which included all Medallion versions. Renault did this for two reasons: 1) The larger, more powerful engines required stronger gearboxes that could not be made to fit into the transaxle assembly common to transverse powertrains, and 2) The longitudinal engine/transmission layout allowed Renault to use equal-length half-shafts from a centrally-mounted gearbox, which reduced torque steering that would have otherwise been brought on by the increased power generated by the larger engines. The longitudinal engine R21s and Medallions thus had slightly shorter wheelbases than the transverse engine R21s. Product plans also called for a four-wheel drive Medallion to be imported in late-1988.

All Medallions came with an aluminum  overhead cam I4 engine with Bendix multi-point fuel injection.
 highway,  city,  combined, with the manual transmission, and
 highway,  city,  combined, with the automatic.

The Medallion featured four-wheel independent suspension with MacPherson struts in the front with negative offset for stability and inclined lower wishbones for anti-dive effect, while the rear suspension is controlled by a V-section cross-member with four transverse torsion bars and inclined shock absorbers.

When the original European Renault 21 models were shown in 1986, they featured a different design compared to the contemporary cars of the era with more rectilinear traditional designs. The new Renault 21 design most closely resembled the aerodynamic look of the Audi 100 models that were introduced in 1983. The Medallion was described "crisp look in contemporary wedge/aerodynamic styling." The station wagon version was judged by one automobile journalist as "arguably the most stylish compact wagon on the market."

The interior of the Medallion was spacious compared to similar cars in the compact segment, which AMC compared it to. The sedan was also notable for its rather commodious trunk.

The station wagon was typically French in design in that it was built on a longer wheelbase than the sedan. The Medallion station wagon seats "five adults in true comfort - and will accept an additional two kids" with the optional bench seat for the cargo area. This was a front-facing third-row seat, such as in the Oldsmobile Vista Cruiser and Ford Freestyle.

Model years

1988
Medallion sedans were offered in base DL and uplevel LX sedans, as well as a DL wagon, for the long 1988 model year. Standard equipment on all Medallions included a tachometer, digital clock, AM/FM stereo, tinted glass, tilt steering wheel, power steering, power brakes, and a driver's seat-height adjuster for the reclining front seats. The station wagon also included a locking storage bin, as well as an adjustable roof rack and a rear-window wiper. George C. Scott was the spokesperson for Renault products at the time and was featured prominently in commercials for the 1988 Renault Medallion, touting its new, larger size and competitive power, interior room, and warranty coverage.

Exterior styling showed many unusual features, including slightly skirted rear wheel arches, fixed chromed door handles with hidden squeeze-type actuators, and a decklid that wrapped over the tops of the rear fenders. At the front, the Medallion featured flush-mounted composite headlamps - a first for an AMC vehicle - mounted on either side of a flush grille with 3 horizontal black bars and a prominent Renault diamond logo. Medallion DL sedans offered a different taillight lens pattern than uplevel LX sedans did, with smoked clear reflector lenses continuing inward from the Medallion's reversing lights, and surrounding the upper portion of the decklid-mounted rear license plate depression. The LX sedans showed red lenses in this area instead. A power sunroof option on LX models was available later in the 1988 model year. Medallion station wagons had a  longer wheelbase, and rear doors were much longer than those of their sedan counterpart, to improve optional third seat ingress and egress. While unusual for its class in the North American market, the wagon's uniquely longer wheelbase (more than  longer than the much larger Eagle Premier's) was in keeping with French station wagon tradition to maximize interior space for passengers or cargo. This design was also used on the competing Peugeot 504 and 505.

The new Renault Medallion station wagon was reviewed by Kiplinger's Personal Finance magazine as "surprisingly comfortable, with a load of standard features for its relatively modest $10,693 base price." The "powerful engine allows it to whiz through city traffic with ease" and the wagon's interior was "spartan," but "spacious and comfortable."

A week-long review of an automatic transmission equipped 1988 Medallion by The Milwaukee Sentinel described it as an "eye-appealing alternative for those shopping for a compact four-door sedan" offering "peppy" performance with an engine that "purred contently at highway speeds" while offering a smooth ride in both the city and on the highway returning an actual combined  fuel economy, but the sedan's light weight, was criticized as too light on open roads in the wind and the insulation to reduce road noise seemed inadequate.

A long-term test by Popular Mechanics found the Medallion "low on flash, high on comfort" especially on long-distance journeys and along the roughest roads in New York City, and the editors came to regard it as a "pretty nice car." Other automotive guides recommended the Medallion for its comfortable ride and interior roominess, as well as summarizing that Chrysler does not "have a domestic model in this category that's quite as nice."

American Motors offered a special optional warranty program exclusively on the Medallion for the 1988 model year called Ultra Plan, which included scheduled maintenance services. After the Chrysler buyout of American Motors, Chrysler took on responsibility for marketing the 1988 Renault Medallion and supported its financing through Chrysler Credit Corporation until the end of the 1988 model year.

1989
For 1989, Chrysler focused on the advanced technology incorporated in the Eagle models. The rear of the 1989 Medallions now featured an “imported for Eagle” badge and the terms of the AMC buyout included the continued sales of Renault-built cars in the U.S. However, Chrysler decided to cease importing the Medallions from Renault at the end of the 1989 model year. This also ended the potential revival of a four-wheel-drive Eagle station wagon.

Marketing
While reviews were initially favorable, the Medallion had a poor launch into the North American market because of AMC's limited marketing resources. There were industry rumors of problems at AMC and Chrysler's takeover of the company overshadowed the Medallion's introduction. Kiplinger's Personal Finance magazine raised the question of continued commitment and service for the Medallion after Chrysler's buyout of AMC, and noted that an expected letter of intent between Chrysler and Renault indicated that Chrysler "it would support the vehicle for a minimum of five years."

The Medallion was a solid entry in a highly competitive market segment. Total U.S. sales were 25,672 spread over three calendar years. This reflects the numerous struggles with the Medallion line that was launched just before Renault exited from U.S. market and Chrysler wanted to continue only the Jeep models. It was ranked as "a damn good car — winning numerous accolades and enjoying a 9-year model run outside the States." Although "it was actually a very nice car to drive," Chrysler discontinued the Medallion soon after purchasing AMC.

The Eagle name came from the innovative all-wheel drive AMC Eagle line, but the Medallion was a standard passenger car and its sales were also hindered by marketing missteps. Chrysler also planned to phase out the Medallion sedan in favor of a four-wheel-drive wagon by 1990. However, the Eagle division in the U.S. went without a 4-wheel-drive station wagon model until the launch of the 1992 Eagle Summit Wagon. In Canada, a 4-wheel-drive wagon was available as the Eagle Vista from 1989 through 1991.

Robert Lutz, the head of the Chrysler Corporation at the time, said in his 2003 book Guts that the Medallion, and its larger linemate, the Premier were "salesproof" in that no matter how attractive and competitive the cars were, customers in large enough number to ensure success just would not take notice. In reality, the corporation was drawing a tighter bead on "import intenders," and rather than working with an independent Renault, Chrysler shifted the Eagle models to badge engineered cars sourced from its Japanese partner since 1971, Mitsubishi Motors. At the time, Chrysler was investing in the Diamond-Star Motors manufacturing joint venture and building a new plant in Normal, Illinois, with an annual capacity of almost a quarter-million vehicles. In 1986, Honda introduced their luxury brand Acura with the Acura Legend and Acura Integra thereby further competing in a crowded market segment.

The smaller Eagle Summit made by Mitsubishi was also marketed by Jeep-Eagle dealers, primarily for Alliance and Encore owners to trade into. Still, with the Medallion "they were stuck with for a couple of years due to legal issues with Renault."

The imported Medallion also competed with Chrysler's numerous domestic Dodge, Plymouth, and Chrysler models. This may have also contributed to a lack of enthusiasm within the company for properly marketing the Medallion - as well as the larger Premier. 

While the first-generation Summit and the much larger Premier were both replaced, the Medallion line had no successor in the U.S. market, despite the appearance of several D-segment midsize concepts in later years: the Eagle Jazz, a radically shortened front-wheel drive fastback, and the Eagle Optima, an aerodynamic all-wheel-drive sedan. In Canada, the Medallion was replaced by the Mitsubishi Galant-based Eagle 2000GTX.

References

External links 

 Renault Owners Club of North America
 

Eagle vehicles
Front-wheel-drive vehicles
Mid-size cars
Renault vehicles
Sedans
Station wagons
Cars introduced in 1987
Cars discontinued in 1989